Jędker, real name Andrzej Wawrynkiewicz, is a rapper from Warsaw, Poland. Member of ZIP Skład (Ziomki i Przyjaciele) and WWO (W Witrynach Odbicia, W Wyjątkowych Okolicznościach), together with DJ Deszczu Strugi, and Sokół.

Discography

1999 ZIP Skład – Chleb Powszedni
2000 W Witrynach Odbicia – Masz I Pomyśl
2002 W Wyjątkowych Okolicznościach – We własnej osobie
2005 W Wyjątkowych Okolicznościach – Witam Was w Rzeczywistości
2005 W Witrynach Odbicia – Życie na kredycie
2007 Jędker Realista – Czas Na Prawdę POL #28
2010 Monopol - Remixed In Poland

Singles
2007 Jędker Realista – Rewers

References

External links
 WWO – Official web site
 Jędker – performer profile to hip-hop.pl
 Profile at MySpace

1977 births
Living people
Rappers from Warsaw